Bexell is a Swedish surname. Notable people with the surname include:

Eva Bexell (born 1945), Swedish author of children's books
Göran Bexell (born 1943), Swedish professor in ethics
Olle Bexell (1909–2003), Swedish decathlete

Swedish-language surnames